History of gay rights is covered by multiple articles:

 LGBT history
 LGBT social movements